Cryptandra campanulata is a species of flowering plant in the family Rhamnaceae and is endemic to South Australia. It is a shrub with narrowly elliptic to narrowly egg-shaped or linear leaves and clusters of white, bell-shaped flowers.

Description
The upper surface of the leaves is glabrous and the edges are turned down or rolled under obscuring the lower surface. The flowers are white and borne singly in up to 20 leaf axils near the ends of branchlets, each flower with 6 to 8 bracts at the base.

Taxonomy and naming
Cryptandra campanulata was first formally described in 1847 by Diederich Franz Leonhard von Schlechtendal in the journal Linnaea. The specific epithet (campanulata) means "bell-shaped", and refers to the large tubular flowers.

Distribution and habitat
This cryptandra grows in shallow soil over rocks, mostly in grassland but also heath and shrubland, and occurs  in the southern Flinders Ranges and the northern Mount Lofty Ranges.

Conservation status
Cryptandra campanulata is listed as "Rare" in the South Australian National Parks and Wildlife Act 1972.

References

campanulata
Rosales of Australia
Flora of South Australia
Plants described in 1847
Taxa named by Diederich Franz Leonhard von Schlechtendal